Drábek (feminine Drábková) is a Czech and Slovak surname. Notable people with the surname include:

David Drábek (born 1970), Czech playwright and theatre director
Dietmar Drabek (born 1965), Austrian football referee
Doug Drabek (born 1962), American baseball player
Jaromír Drábek (born 1965), Czech politician
Kyle Drabek (born 1987), American baseball player
Václav Drábek (born 1976), Czech ice hockey player

Czech-language surnames